The Begonia Belle Stakes, raced as Furphy Sprint (2019) is a registered Victoria Racing Club Group 3 Thoroughbred horse race for mares aged four years old and upwards, run at set weights with penalties, over a distance of 1100 metres, held annually at Flemington Racecourse, Melbourne, Australia in November during the VRC Spring Carnival on Victoria Derby Day.  Total prize money for the race is A$200,000.

History
The registered race is named after Begonia Belle, winner of the 1969 Newmarket Handicap.
The race was originally raced on the third day of the VRC Spring Carnival, VRC Oaks day but was moved in 2016 to the first day of the carnival.

Name
 2005 - The Heaven Sprint
 2006–2007 - Crown Trophy
 2008 - Crown Promenade Trophy
 2009–2010  - Crown Promenade Stakes
 2011–2015  - G.H. Mumm Stakes
 2016 - Sensis Stakes
 2017 - Skip Sprint
 2018 onwards - Furphy Sprint

Distance
 2005 onwards - 1100 metres.

Grade
 2005–2008 - Handicap
 2009–2013 - Listed Race
 2013 onwards - Group 3 race

Winners

 2022 - Asfoora
 2021 - Minhaaj 
 2020 - Fiesta
 2019 - Tofane
 2018 - Divine Quality
 2017 - Lyuba
 2016 - Sheidel
 2015 - Pittsburgh Flyer
 2014 - Vain Queen 
 2013 - Dystopia
 2012 - Honey Flower
 2011 - Ortensia
 2010 - Status Symbol
 2009 - Very Discreet
 2008 - Beaming
 2007 - Soleil
 2006 - Street Smart
 2005 - Covet Thee

See also
 List of Australian Group races
 Group races

References

Horse races in Australia